James Dees may refer to:
 James Parker Dees, founder and first bishop of the Orthodox Anglican Church and the Orthodox Anglican Communion
 James Dees (cricketer), English cricketer

See also
 Jack Dee (James Andrew Innes Dee), English stand-up comedian and actor